The 2022 All-Ireland Senior Camogie Championship Final, the 91st event of its kind and the culmination of the 2022 All-Ireland Senior Camogie Championship, was played at Croke Park on 7 August 2022. The finals of the 2022 All-Ireland Intermediate Camogie Championship and All-Ireland Junior Camogie Championship took place earlier that day at Croke Park.

Kilkenny defeated Cork in the final to win their 15th title. Denise Gaule landed the winning point from a free in injury time.

Details

References

1
All-Ireland Senior Camogie Championship Finals
camogie
All-Ireland Senior Camogie Championship Final, 2022